Pleurotomella formosa is a species of sea snail, a marine gastropod mollusk in the family Raphitomidae.

Description
The length of the shell varies between 15 mm and 22 mm.

The thin, opaque shell is, dark-colored. The sculpture is variable, the longitudinal varying from striae to ribs, sometimes nodulous. The suture is deep, with a sloping infrasutural groove. The sinus is remarkably deep and broad.

Distribution
This marine species was found at bathyal depths off the Faroes in the North Atlantic Ocean.

References

formosa
Gastropods described in 1867